Barefoot Songs is a large song cycle for voice and piano by Allan Pettersson.

Background
The 24 songs in Swedish were composed between 1943 and 1945. At this time, Pettersson was violist at the Stockholm Concert Society. The text of the songs was written by Pettersson himself and is partly autobiographical. The main topic of the song cycle is his youth in poverty. The diatonic songs were kept simple, but the text is not easy to understand and uses a highly poetic and cryptic language. Pettersson wrote over 100 poems, but only 24 were set to music. The Swedish Broadcasting Corporation and his publisher Nordiska Musikförlaget initially refused to publish the songs. The cycle was first published in 1976. Musicologist Andreas Krause has posited that the name Barefoot Songs is a reminiscence and tribute to Schubert's Winterreise. "Barefoot on the ice" is a quotation from the 24th and last song . Some songs are reminiscent of ballads or romances, folk songs or hymns and Schubert's Winterreise.

Synopsis
  (Song of Lament)
  (Wise Men and Clenched Hands)
  (Mother is poor)
  (Love errs)
  (The Star and the Bars)
  (Something got lost)
  (Flower, Tell Me)
  (Winter Song)
  (The little one must wait)
  (The Maiden and the Lying Wind)
  (Death of a Fiddler)
  (You know)
  (Telling Lies)
  (The Lord Walks in the Meadow)
  (The Dogs on the Sea)
  (Little Squabbler)
  (I think of things)
  (Flower at my Foot)
  (The one that got away)
  (My Yearning)
  (Now one awaits the winter)
  (The Friend in Sunday Land)
  (While the Flies are Buzzing)
  (He Will Extinguish My Light)

Quotations
Pettersson quoted songs from his 24 Barefoot Songs in several of his larger scale compositions. His 6th Symphony cites the song Han ska släcka min lykta (He Will Extinguish My Light), the 14th Symphony cites Klokar och knythänder (Wise Men and Clenched Hands) and Violin Concerto No. 2 cites Herren går på ängen (The Lord Walks in the Meadow).

Arrangements

Orchestration
In 1968–1969, conductor and composer Antal Doráti arranged eight of Pettersson's Barefoot Songs as full-scale orchestral songs.
  (The Lord Walks in the Meadow)
  (Wise Men and Clenched Hands)
  (Flower, Tell Me)
  (The Maiden and the Lying Wind)
  (While the Flies are Buzzing)
  (Telling Lies)
  (My Yearning)
  (Death of a Fiddler)

Suite
In 1969, conductor and composer Eskil Hemberg arranged six songs for mixed choir.
  (The Lord Walks in the Meadow)
  (The Friend in Sunday Land)
  (Flower, Tell Me)
  (Now one awaits the winter)
  (Death of a Fiddler)
  (Telling Lies)

Selected recordings
 Margot Rödin (mezzo-soprano), Erik Saedén (baritone), Arnold Östman (piano) (Swedish Society Discofil LP 1974 and CD 1988) 
 Monica Groop (mezzo-soprano), Cord Garben (piano) (CPO CD 1998) 
 8 Barefoot Songs (orchestrated Antal Doráti), Erik Saedén (baritone), Antal Doráti, Stockholm Philharmonic Orchestra (Lyssna 2LP 1974, HNH 2LP 1977) 
 8 Barefoot Songs (orchestrated Antal Doráti), Anders Larsson (baritone), Christian Lindberg, Nordic Chamber Orchestra (BIS CD 2009) 
 Suite from Barefoot Songs, Margareta Dahlström (soprano), Eskil Hemberg, Stockholm University Chorus (Caprice CD 1988)

References

Citations

Bibliography
 
 

Compositions by Allan Pettersson
1945 compositions
Classical song cycles
Songs based on poems